Zaręba  is a village in the administrative district of Gmina Siekierczyn, within Lubań County, Lower Silesian Voivodeship, in south-western Poland.

The village has a population of 1,800.

References

Villages in Lubań County